Events in the year 1957 in Spain.

Incumbents
Caudillo: Francisco Franco

Births
March 28 - Inés Ayala.
April 6 - Manuel Cervantes.
August 6 - Salvador Garriga Polledo.
September 6 - Mario Lloret.
November 15 - Jesús Fuentes.

Deaths

March 29 María Josefa Segovia Morón, Spanish Roman Catholic laywoman and venerable (b. 1891)
April 8 Pedro Segura y Sáenz, Spanish Roman Catholic archbishop (b. 1880)
 December 31 – Óscar Domínguez, Spanish painter (b. 1906)

See also
 List of Spanish films of 1957

References

 
Years of the 20th century in Spain
1950s in Spain
Spain
Spain